The Aeros Discus is a family of Ukrainian high-wing, single-place, hang gliders, designed and produced by Aeros of Kyiv and introduced in 2002.

Design and development
The Discus series was conceived as a single-place intermediate hang glider for recreational cross country flying.

Aeros explains the design role:

Typical of the line, the Discus 148 model is made from aluminum tubing, with the wing covered in Dacron sailcloth. Its  span wing is cable braced with a kingpost. The nose angle is 128° and the aspect ratio is 7.3:1.

The wing is also used on the Aeros ANT and the British Flylight Dragonfly, Flylight Motorfloater and Flylight E-Dragon ultralight trikes in its Discus T configuration.

Variants
Discus
Original model introduced as an intermediate glider in 2002.
Discus 148
Version sold circa 2003.
Discus A
Version sold in 2012, with  length when packed for ground transportation.
Discus B
Version sold in 2012, with  length when packed for ground transportation.
Discus C
Introduced in 2006, this model offers higher performance. It features a Matrix (Bainbridge) sail and Wills Wing Litestream down tubes, Wills Wing basebar with streamlined fittings and a Wills Wing Slipstream kingpost.
Discus M
Version with modified keel for use with Swedish Aerosport Mosquito and other power packages.
Discus 15T
Version of the basic Discus wing, reinforced and with a modified control bar, for use on small ultralight trikes.

Specifications (Discus 148)

References

External links

Hang gliders
Discus